Timo Olavi Harakka (born 31 December 1962) is a Finnish politician. Since April 2015, he has represented the electoral district of Uusimaa in the Parliament of Finland as a Social Democrat.

In June 2019, Harakka was appointed Minister of Employment in the Rinne Cabinet. He served in the position until the collapse of the cabinet in December 2019, after which he joined the subsequent Marin Cabinet as Minister of Transport and Communications.

Early life and education
Harakka was born in Helsinki. Both parents his were deaf and therefore his first language is Finnish sign language. He worked as a journalist for several years and has been editor-in-chief of both Jyväskylän Ylioppilaslehti, magazine of the students' union of the University of Jyväskylä, and Vihreä Lanka, magazine linked with the Green League. Since 1997 Harakka worked for Yle and hosted television programs called Musta laatikko, Pressiklubi, and 10 kirjaa. In 2005 he graduated from the Helsinki Theatre Academy with a master of arts in theatre and drama.

Political career
In the 2014 European Parliament election Harakka received 22,839 votes and was elected substitute member of the European Parliament for the Social Democratic Party. In the 2015 Finnish parliamentary election he received 5,497 votes from Uusimaa and was elected to the Parliament. He subsequently served the Finance and budget spokesperson of the parliamentary group and member of the Grand Committee of the Parliament. On 15 December 2016 Harakka announced his candidacy for the leadership of Social Democratic Party. He was defeated by the incumbent party leader Antti Rinne in the election on 4 February 2017.

On 6 June 2019, Harakka was appointed Minister of Employment. Early in his tenure, when Finland held the rotating presidency of the Council of the European Union in 2019, he chaired the meetings of the Employment, Social Policy, Health and Consumer Affairs Council.

Political positions
Harakka is well known for colourful initiatives and statements. He has described Boris Johnson's decision 2019 to prorogue parliament as "incredible", and compared it to "banning saunas in Finland".

Honors 

  Order of the White Rose of Finland (Finland, 2022)

References

External links 

1962 births
Living people
Politicians from Helsinki
Green League politicians
Social Democratic Party of Finland politicians
Ministers of Labour of Finland
Ministers of Transport and Public Works of Finland
Members of the Parliament of Finland (2015–19)
Members of the Parliament of Finland (2019–23)